The Getz Ice Shelf is the largest Antarctic ice shelf along the SE Pacific-Antarctic coastline, over  long and from  wide, bordering the Hobbs and Bakutis Coasts of Marie Byrd Land between the McDonald Heights and Martin Peninsula. Several large islands are partially or wholly embedded in the ice shelf, pinning the calving front.

Summer temperature and salinity measurements from 1994 to 2010 show the shelf is subject to more changeable oceanic forcing than other Antarctic shelves. Beneath cold surface waters, the thermocline was ~200 m shallower in 2007 than in 2000, indicative of shifting access of deep water to the continental shelf and ice shelf base. The calculated area-average basal melt rates was between 1.1 and 4.1 m of ice per year, making Getz the largest source of meltwater to the Southern Ocean.

The ice shelf westward of Siple Island was discovered by the United States Antarctic Service (USAS) in December 1940. The portion eastward of Siple Island was first delineated from air photos taken by U.S. Navy Operation Highjump, 1946–47. The entire feature was mapped by the United States Geological Survey from U.S. Navy air photos of 1962–65. It was named by the USAS (1939–41) for George F. Getz of Chicago, Illinois, who helped furnish the seaplane for the expedition.

In February 2021, it was reported that the fourteen glaciers forming the shelf had all speeded up, and had lost 315 gigatonnes of ice since 1994. The cause of the speed up has been posited as "ocean forcing", a process where relatively warm deep ocean water melts the glaciers from below.

See also
DeVicq Glacier
List of glaciers
List of Antarctic ice shelves
Reynolds Strait

Further reading 
 Jacobs, S., C. Giulivi, P. Dutrieux, E. Rignot, F. Nitsche, and J. Mouginot, Getz Ice Shelf melting response to changes in ocean forcing, J. Geophys. Res. Oceans,118, 4152–4168, doi:10.1002/jgrc.20298
 MARGIE TURRIN, Year by Year, Line by Line, We Build an Image of Getz Ice Shelf, NOVEMBER 6, 2016
 Assmann, K. M., Darelius, E.,Wåhlin, A. K., Kim, T. W., Lee, S. H., Getz Warm Circumpolar Deep Water at the western Getz Ice Shelf front, Antarctica, Geophysical Research Letters, 46, 870–878. https://doi.org/10.1029/2018GL081354

References

Ice shelves of Antarctica
Bodies of ice of Marie Byrd Land